Jorge Jair Toledo Bravo (born 22 June 1996) is a Peruvian footballer who plays as a right-back for Peruvian Primera División side Ayacucho FC.

Club career

Melgar
After good performances in the 2016 U-20 Copa Libertadores, Toledo was promoted to FBC Melgar's first team for the 2017 season. He got his official debut for Melgar in the Peruvian Primera División on 5 March 2017 against Sport Rosario. He made 10 appearances for Melgar before he left the club at the end of the year.

Carlos A. Mannucci
On 6 March 2018, Toledo joined Peruvian Segunda División club Carlos A. Mannucci. He made his debut on 22 April 2018 against Deportivo Hualgayoc. Toledo was noted for 15 games in his first season and helped the club securing promotion to the Primera División. However, he was rarely used in the 2019 season, playing only 164 minutes for the team, and for that reason, he mostly played with the reserve team, where he was the captain. Therefore, he was loaned out to Segunda División club Juan Aurich on 28 August 2019 for the rest of the year. He left Carlos club at the end of 2019

Cusco
In January 2020, he moved to Cusco FC on a deal until the end of 2021. He made his debut on 3 February 2020, where he played all 90 minutes in a 0–2 defeat against Deportivo Binacional.

Cantolao
On 5 January 2021, Toledo signed with Cantolao. He got his debut on 13 March 2020 against Carlos A. Mannucci.

Return to Juan Aurich
In the summer 2021, Toledo returned to his former club Juan Aurich.

Ayacucho
Ahead of the 2022 season, Toledo joined Ayacucho FC.

References

External links
 
 

Living people
1996 births
Association football defenders
Peruvian footballers
Peruvian Segunda División players
Peruvian Primera División players
FBC Melgar footballers
Carlos A. Mannucci players
Juan Aurich footballers
Cusco FC footballers
Academia Deportiva Cantolao players
Ayacucho FC footballers